Siras has different meanings:

 Albizia, is a genus of about 150 species of mostly fast-growing subtropical and tropical  trees and shrubs in the subfamily Mimosoideae of the legume family, Fabaceae.
 Ramchandra Siras (1948–2010), Indian linguist